Bryotropha altitudophila is a moth of the family Gelechiidae. It is found in central North America, from Saskatchewan to Mexico in the south.

The forewings are ochreous grey to brown with a fuscous costal edge and with distinct blackish basal spots at the costa and tornus. The hindwings are pale ochreous grey, but darker toward the apex. Adults have been recorded on wing from early June to early August. There is probably one generation per year.

Etymology
The species name is derived from Latin altitudo (meaning altitude) and Greek philo (meaning friend of) and refers to the higher altitudes which this species prefers.

References

External links

Moths described in 2004
Moths of North America
altitudophila